Mark Sinnett is a Canadian poet, novelist and short story writer. Originally from England, Sinnett moved to Canada as a teenager in 1980. He won the Gerald Lampert Award in 1998 for his poetry collection The Landing, and the Toronto Book Award in 2010 for his novel The Carnivore. He was a shortlisted finalist for the Arthur Ellis Award for Best First Novel in 2005 for his novel The Border Guards.

He is currently based in Kingston, Ontario, where he also works as a real estate agent.

Works

Poetry
The Landing (1997)
Some Late Adventure of the Feelings (2000)

Fiction
Bull (1998)
The Border Guards (2004)
The Carnivore (2009)

References

External links

20th-century Canadian poets
Canadian male poets
21st-century Canadian poets
21st-century Canadian novelists
Canadian male novelists
Canadian male short story writers
English emigrants to Canada
Writers from Kingston, Ontario
Living people
21st-century Canadian short story writers
20th-century Canadian short story writers
20th-century Canadian male writers
21st-century Canadian male writers
Year of birth missing (living people)